Guru Gopinath Nadana Gramam is located in a place called Vattiyoorkavu in Thiruvananthapuram district of Kerala. The center was established in 1995 to impart training to young folks in different art forms such as Kerala Nadanam, classical music, light music. The institution is offering training for music enthusiasts in musical instruments such as tabla and veena as well. The institute is owned by the Department of Culture, Government of Kerala. The Nadana Gramam was instituted in the name of a great artist by the name Guru Gopinath who has shown to the world that the dance forms such as Kathakali can be enacted on the stage with the stories from the day-to-day life, apart from the stories from Hindu Mythology.

Danseuse

Guru Gopinath was an artist who brought out the Kathakali dance form from the four premises of temples and palaces and made it simple enough for the ordinary people to understand and enjoy. Another contribution from this theater figure is the creation of modern dance style called Kerala Natanam, from Kathakali. Kerala natanam imbibed the Amgika abhinaya of Kathakali in toto, gave up its heavy costumes and embraced the simple and character oriented costumes (Aahaarya abhinaya) to get more acceptance from the ordinary people. In Vachika abhinaya the Sopana samgeetha of  Kathakali give way to the easy to follow Carnatic music and its instruments and later Hindustani instruments were also included

The Rasabhinaya or Saatvika abhinaya  is made beautiful to fit with the modern theatrical presentations. It brought together various elements in the folk arts and Ravi Varma paintings for developing the Kerala NaTanam Costumes. There is no standard costume for this dance form. It assumes different and newer costumes according to the character enacted or presented

During his time, it was believed that one should not contaminate the Kathakali art in the name of its reform, instead one should develop his/her style with a unique signature. Accordingly, as a creative mentor of this dance form, he developed a new style of dancing called Kerala Natanam. This new dance from was able to appeal to the masses without compromising on its classical background. This art form is called 'Kathakali simplified'.

History

At the time of his death while playing the role of King Dasaradha in his epic ballet 'Ramayana' on stage in the year 1987, he was running a  dance school  Viswa Kala Kendra  at a place called Vattiyoorkavu in Thiruvananthapuram district in Kerala. In 1992, Viswa Kala Kendra handed over 2.03 acres of land in its ownership to set up a dance museum in memory of  Guru Gopinbath to  the Kerala Government The Culture Department took over the land and registered a society  and named the premises  as Guru Gopinath Nadana Gramam.

Currently, Guru Gopinath National Dance Museum functions here. This Saraswati temple for different art forms is under the patronage of the Department of Culture of the Government of Kerala. Since its establishment, the center has become a focal point for various cultural activities involving the youths of Kerala. Along with this center, the Kerala Natanam created by the legendary guru has now become popular in youth festivals in the state.

Facilities

Now Guru Gopinath Nadana Gramam is situated in a campus whose area is two acres and three cents. The campus also includes an amphitheater and a museum dedicated to Guru Gopinath. The theater constructed here has several features that surpass the technical brilliance offered through 3D effects. Hence, this theater is called as 4D theater. In order to enhance the visual effect, the seats present in the theater move in tune with the visual effects shown on the screen.

In order to enhance the learning experience, the center also has a state-of-the-art library that has all the important books on all the dance forms taught here. A visit to this dance library would take the visitor to a totally different realm of experience. Unlike ordinary libraries that have tall shelves with wide drawers stacked with books, this library has pictures of different forms of dances attached to the walls. In front of each such picture is a sheet in the shape of an umbrella. A visitor can go near the picture of the art form of his interest and stand beneath the sheath and press a button visible by the side of the picture to know more about that art form. On pressing the button, the visitor can choose the language of the medium through which the dance form is explained. The picture present on the wall also gets automatically changed in accordance with the explanation given to offer a better learning experience. The hearing of the explanation by the visitor will not be disturbing others in the library because only he will be hearing that.

Courses Offered

The cultural village conducts classes for all types of traditional and modern dance forms. The main aim of this center is to promote all forms of dance, with special emphasis on Kerala Natanam. Looking forward, this Saraswathi temple aspires to become a center that promotes all forms of art in coming decades. The gramam offers a one-year certificate course and a three-year diploma course. Both the courses are offered for a meager monthly fee of Rs. 2000. For enrolling in the said courses, the minimum qualification one should have is the genuine interest and talent in the dance forms for which the courses are being conducted. Currently, there are 250 students studying about 50 dance forms at the cultural village.

References

 Guru Gopinath
 Training Centres of Kerala
 

1995 establishments in Kerala
Thiruvananthapuram district
Organisations based in Kerala
Organizations established in 1995